The Namibian Police Force (NAMPOL) is the national police force of Namibia. It was established by the Namibian Constitution and enacted by an act of Parliament. The Namibian Police Force replaced the South West African Police as the national police force of the country in 1990. Sebastian Ndeitunga was its inspector general since 2005 to 2022. Joseph Shikongo is the current inspector general.  NAMPOL's functions are overseen by the Ministry of Home Affairs, Immigration, Safety and Security.

Organization
The force is headed by an inspector general (IG) who holds the rank of lieutenant general. The IG has two deputies who both hold the rank of major general. The two deputy inspectors general are responsible for administration and operations.

Divisions/directorates

Communications
Finance
Gender & Welfare
Human Resources
Internal Investigation
Procurement & Logistics
Training & Development
FPPD Directorate
Traffic Law Enforcement
Air Wing Directorate
Special Reserve Force
Operations Directorate
VIPP Directorate
Special Field Force
Special Branch
Explosive
Public Relations
NAMPOL Band
Crime Investigation Directorate
National Forensic Science
Agronomic & Animal Husbandry
Special Operations
Principal Staff

Regional commands
All police operations in Namibia's 14 regions are headed by a regional commander with the rank of commissioner. The Khomas region hosting the seat of government and capital city is an exception as the regional commander is a major general.

Ranks

Equipment
The Air Wing Directorate operates a fleet of 3 helicopters.

Helicopters
 1 Eurocopter EC145 Helicopter
 2 Eurocopter AS350 Helicopter

The Water Wing Directorate is small and consists of a number of swampboats stationed in Zambezi Region and a patrol boat in Walvis Bay.
 Dr Hifikepunye Pohamba Patrol Boat

Notable Police officers

Inspectors general
 Lieutenant General Lucas Hangula, inspector general 1995–2005
 Lieutenant General Sebastian Ndeitunga, inspector general 2005–2022
 Lieutenant General Joseph Shikongo, inspector general since 2022

Lower ranks
 Danger Ashipala, Commissioner of the Special Field Force 1996–2007
 Chief Inspector Christina Van-Dunem Da Fonsech, active since 2003
 Naftal Lungameni Sakaria, Oshana regional commander since 2022

References

External links 
Namibian Police Force Homepage

Law enforcement in Namibia
1990 establishments in Namibia